Rocket Man: Greatest Hits Live was a concert tour by Elton John which lasted for three years from 2007 to 2010.

While performing the Red Piano Europe concerts, Elton also performed a concert series known as Rocket Man and at the same time performing on The Captain and the Kid Tour.

The first performance took place on 28 September 2007 in Missoula, Montana. The final concert took place on 8 May 2010 in Boca del Río, Mexico.

Background
The first Rocket Man took place on 28 September 2007 in Missoula, Montana. The tour consisted of 23 concerts including 10 in North America, 2 in Asia and 11 in Oceania.

The tour ended with two solo performances in Tokyo, Japan at the Nippon Budokan and eleven solo concerts in Australia.

The 2008 leg of the tour consisted of 68 concert performances. The tour started in January with a performance in Abu Dhabi, United Arab Emirates before travelling to Europe and the North America to perform a series of solo concerts.

After touring North America by himself, Elton then continued the tour backed by his band before travelling to Asia and, for the second year running, Oceania. After finishing the tour of Australia, Elton & the band briefly returned to the United States before returning once again to Europe. The European tour included several large open-air concerts, including 
Liberty Stadium in Swansea, Wales
The Darlington Arena in Darlington, England
Keepmoat Stadium in Doncaster, England
The tour also included two performances in Surrey, England.

On 4 May 2008 Elton performed in Chigwell, Essex at Alan Sugar's 40th Wedding Anniversary.

The tour ended on 15 November in Uncasville, Connecticut.

The 2009 leg of the tour started off with four performances in South America, it was only the fourth time that Elton had performed a tour in South America. After touring South America, Elton moved into North America where he performed a series of concerts before continuing to Europe.

The European leg of the tour started with a large open-air concert in Limerick, Ireland at Thomond Park. Elton continued to perform two more open-air concerts in England.

In the fall of 2009, Elton toured with Ray Cooper in Europe.

The 2010 leg of the tour was the last time that Elton John would tour the Rocket Man concert series. The tour started with two performances in Hawaii with Ray Cooper. It was the first time that Elton had performed there in nine years.

The tour moved on to South Africa for five shows, where Elton again performed with Ray Cooper.

After returning from South Africa, Elton set out on the last leg of the Rocket Man tour. Elton was once again backed by his band. The first and last dates of this leg were performances in Mexico, where Elton had not performed a concert since 2001.

Tour dates

Festivals and other miscellaneous performances

This concert was a part of "Top of the Mountain"
This concert was a part of "Dubai World Cup"
This concert was a solo concert

Cancellations and rescheduled shows

References

External links

 Information Site with Tour Dates

Elton John concert tours
2007 concert tours
2008 concert tours
2009 concert tours
2010 concert tours